José Jesús Reyna García (born 22 February 1952) is a Mexican lawyer and politician from the Institutional Revolutionary Party who served as Interim Governor of Michoacán from April to October 2013. He also has served as Deputy of the LV Legislature of the Mexican Congress (2006-2009) representing Michoacán.

Reyna García was accused of having ties to the Knights Templar Cartel in April 2014 and was sent to prison for organized crime charges a month later. Guillermo Valencia Reyes, former mayor of Tepalcatepec, Michoacán, tweeted on 16 June 2014, that Governor Fausto Vallejo was using Reyna García as a scapegoat to protect his son, Rodrigo Vallejo Mora. Two days later Vallejo resigned. Reyna García was released from prison in December 2018. He was the only politician convicted after the investigations undertaken by federal commissioner Alfredo Castillo Cervantes.

References

1952 births
Living people
Politicians from Michoacán
20th-century Mexican lawyers
Governors of Michoacán
Members of the Chamber of Deputies (Mexico) for Michoacán
Institutional Revolutionary Party politicians
People from Huetamo
21st-century Mexican politicians
Deputies of the LV Legislature of Mexico